Finn van Breemen (born 25 February 2003) is a Dutch professional footballer who plays a centre-back for Eerste Divisie club ADO Den Haag.

Career
Van Breemen joined the academy at ADO Den Haag in 2012. He is a left footed central defender who can also play at left back although that is not his favourite position. He made his Eerste Divisie debut on the 6 May, 2022 against FC Emmen. He described it as a “dream come true” but acknowledged the step up in pace and the change in atmosphere from youth age football. June 2022, he signed his first contract with ADO Den Haag to keep him with the club until the summer of 2024 with the option of an extra year.

References

External links
 

2003 births
Living people
People from Pijnacker-Nootdorp
Dutch footballers
Association football defenders
ADO Den Haag players
Eerste Divisie players
Footballers from South Holland
DHC Delft players